Tintus Arianto Wibowo (born 19 August 1960) is an Indonesian former professional tennis player.

Biography
Born in Surabaya, Wibowo was a regular fixture in the Indonesia Davis Cup team during the 1980s, featuring in a total of 17 ties. This includes World Group appearances in 1983 and 1989, where he played singles rubbers against Mats Wilander in the former and Boris Becker in the latter.

Wibowo was a two-time Southeast Asian Games singles champion and also represented Indonesia at the Asian Games. He won an Asian Games gold medal in the team event at New Delhi in 1982 and a mixed doubles bronze medal in Seoul in 1986.

Together with his wife, Federation Cup player Suzanna Anggarkusuma, Wibowo runs the Lucky Tennis School in Jakarta. Their son, Ayrton Wibowo, also coaches at the school and is a former Davis Cup player.

See also
List of Indonesia Davis Cup team representatives

References

External links
 
 
 

1960 births
Living people
Indonesian male tennis players
Sportspeople from Surabaya
Tennis players at the 1982 Asian Games
Tennis players at the 1986 Asian Games
Tennis players at the 2002 Asian Games
Medalists at the 1982 Asian Games
Medalists at the 1986 Asian Games
Medalists at the 2002 Asian Games
Asian Games medalists in tennis
Asian Games gold medalists for Indonesia
Asian Games bronze medalists for Indonesia
Competitors at the 1981 Southeast Asian Games
Competitors at the 1983 Southeast Asian Games
Competitors at the 1985 Southeast Asian Games
Competitors at the 1987 Southeast Asian Games
Competitors at the 1989 Southeast Asian Games
Southeast Asian Games gold medalists for Indonesia
Southeast Asian Games silver medalists for Indonesia
Southeast Asian Games bronze medalists for Indonesia
Southeast Asian Games medalists in tennis
21st-century Indonesian people
20th-century Indonesian people